Colyton could be:

Colyton, New South Wales, Australia
Colyton, Devon, England
Colyton, New Zealand

See also
 Coylton, a village and civil parish in South Ayrshire, Scotland